VCU Rams soccer may refer to either of the soccer teams that represent the Virginia Commonwealth University:
VCU Rams men's soccer
VCU Rams women's soccer